Rodik is a village northeast of Kozina in the Municipality of Hrpelje-Kozina in the Littoral region of Slovenia.

The parish church in the settlement is dedicated to the Trinity and belongs to the Koper Diocese.

References

External links

Rodik on Geopedia

Populated places in the Municipality of Hrpelje-Kozina